The  (lit. Kansai Airport Expressway) is a 4-laned national expressway in Izumisano, Osaka, Japan. It is owned and operated by West Nippon Expressway Company.

Route description
The expressway is a short connector route linking the Sky Gate Bridge R, and ultimately, Kansai International Airport, with the Hanwa Expressway.

National Route 481 serves as a frontage road for the expressway.

History
The Kansai-Kūkō Expressway opened on 2 April 1994, five months prior to the opening of Kansai International Airport.

Junction list
The entire expressway is in Osaka Prefecture.

See also

References

External links
 West Nippon Expressway Company

Expressways in Japan
Roads in Osaka Prefecture